The Federal Government Girls College, Bida (FGGC BIDA) is a secondary boarding school for girls at Bida, Niger State, Nigeria. It was established in the mid 1970s.

History
FGGC Bida was established in 1974 and the first set graduated in 1979. It was established in the desire for Nigeria's national unity, national integration and academic excellence. As a boarding school, the school has educated girls who have entered the professions in different fields of life working nationally and internationally.

The Federal Government Girls College Bida is among the 104, Federal Government owned Unity Colleges managed by the
Federal Ministry of Education, Nigeria. Location of the school at Bida, Niger State. Bida is a Local Government Area in Niger State, Nigeria, A Nupe, speaking town.

Notable alumnae
 Aishah Ahmad, Deputy Governor of the Central Bank of Nigeria
 Beatrice Jedy-Agba, lawyer and anti-human trafficking advocate
Justice Amina Adamu Aliyu, High Court Judge, Kano State

See also

Education Index
:Category:Secondary education by country for secondary education in individual countries
List of schools by country
List of countries by secondary education attainment

References

External links
website

Educational institutions established in 1974
1974 establishments in Nigeria
Girls' schools in Nigeria
Education in Niger State